Geoffrey Pugen (born 1975) is a Toronto-based video artist.

Career
Working with video, film, performance, and photography, Pugen explores alternate realities through simulating and re-contextualizing media histories.

Pugen has made several works that have been shown internationally including Utopics, Sahara Sahara, and Bridge Kids.

Pugen has exhibited his art, films and videos at the Museum of Contemporary Canadian Art, World Wide Short Film Festival, Berlin Transmediale International Media Arts Festival, European Media Art Festival, and the Poland 12th International Media Art Biennale WRO 07. Publications include Adbusters, Descant Magazine and Future Species. He is a recipient of the K.M. Hunter Award for Interdisciplinary art.

Gallery Representation

Pugen is currently represented by MKG127 in Toronto.

References

External links
 Nuit Blanche: The Tie Break, Recreating a Classic Tennis Game
 Technologies of Intuition: Geoffrey Pugen's Bridge Kids

Canadian video artists
Canadian multimedia artists
Artists from Ontario
Living people
1975 births